John Smyth or Smith (1744 – 1809) was a clergyman and Master of Pembroke College, Oxford.

Education
He was educated at John Roysse's Free School in Abingdon, (now Abingdon School) from 1756 to 1761.

He earned a B.A (1765) and M.A (1769) at Pembroke. B.D. and Doctor of Divinity (D.D.) 1796.

Career
John Smyth became Master of Pembroke in 1796.

The close relationship between Abingdon School and Pembroke College resulted in seven Old Abingdonians being appointed as consecutive masters at Pembroke between 1710 and 1843.  They were Colwell Brickenden 1709–1714; Matthew Panting, 1714–1738; John Ratcliffe, 1738–1775; William Adams, 1775–1789; William Sergrove 1789–1796; John Smyth, 1796-1809 and George William Hall, 1809–1843.

He was rector of Coln Rogers (1799), curate of Eastleach-Turville, rector of Rudford (1801), vicar of Fairford (1804) and canon of Gloucester (1796-1809). He was also a Steward of the OA Club in 1805.

See also
 List of Old Abingdonians
 List of Pembroke College, Oxford, people

References

1744 births
1809 deaths
Masters of Pembroke College, Oxford
People educated at Abingdon School